Gilbert Beech (9 January 1922 – 2009) was an English footballer who played in the Football League for Swansea Town. His brother Cyril was also a professional footballer and played with Gilbert at Swansea.

Career
Beech, who played left-back, set the record for most consecutive league games started with Swansea at 106, since matched by Ashley Williams. While at Swansea, Beech played on the Swans team which won the 1949–50 Welsh Cup.

After his second spell at Merthyr he also played alongside his brother at Hereford United and Brecon Corinthians.

References

1922 births
2009 deaths
Sportspeople from Tamworth, Staffordshire
English footballers
English Football League players
Merthyr Tydfil F.C. players
Swansea City A.F.C. players
Association football defenders
Hereford United F.C. players
Brecon Corinthians F.C. players